Leslee Nathan Jesunathan (born 2 January 2000) is a Malaysian footballer who plays as a winger for Kelantan.

Club career

Petaling Jaya City
On 27 May 2021, Leslee made his debut for the club in a 1-4 loss to Kedah Darul Aman during Malaysia Super League match.

References

External links
 

2000 births
Living people
People from Selangor
Malaysian footballers
Malaysian people of Indian descent
Association football midfielders
Malaysia Super League players
Petaling Jaya City FC players